The B18 is a 1.8 L inline four cylinder automobile engine produced by Volvo from 1961 through 1968. A larger 2.0 L derivative called the B20 debuted in 1969.

Despite being a pushrod design, the engines can rev to 6,500 rpm. They are also reputed to be very durable.

B18 

The B18 has a single cam-in-block, operating  two overhead valves (OHV) per cylinder by pushrods and rocker arms. The crankshaft rides in five main bearings, making the B18 quite different in design from its predecessor, the three-bearing B16.

The engine was used in Volvo's PV544, P210 Duett, 120 (Amazon), P1800 and 140 series. It could also be found in the L3314 and the Bandvagn 202 military vehicles. The B18 was fitted to many Volvo Penta sterndrive marine propulsion systems. It was also used in the Facel Vega Facel III and the Marcos 1800 GT.

There are four variations of this engine:
 B18A: Single carburettor version.
 B18B: Dual carburettor version with a higher compression ratio, fitted variously with dual sidedraft SU or Zenith/Stromberg carburettors.
 B18C: Single carburettor version with a lower compression ratio and mechanical RPM regulator, fitted in the gasoline powered versions of the Volvo BM 320 tractor. This version was also used for the elevator in the PS-15 radar system.
 B18D Dual carburettor version with a lower compression ratio.

DOHC 
In 1971 Swedish engineer Gunnar Axelsson developed a DOHC cylinder head for the B18 engine family. This cylinder head was used in competition Volvos for several years. On 1 January 2014 the Grainger & Worrall company announced that they had partnered with Axelsson to reproduce the DOHC head for the B18 engine. Power output of the base engine was expected to be , while a high-output version developing  would also be available.

B36 

In 1952 Volvo unveiled the Volvo Philip concept car powered by a 3.6 litre V8 engine that would later be called the B36. The V8 engine had exactly the same bore and stroke dimensions as the four-cylinder B18, leading some to suggest that the B18 is one-half of the V8. Significant differences between the two engines included the fact that while the V8 engine has crossflow cylinder heads, the four cylinder has a reverse-flow cylinder head. This suggests that the engines are for the most part separate designs.

B20 

The cylinders are on  split bore centers, where the spacing between cylinders 2 and 3 is wider than that between cylinders 1 and 2 or 3 and 4. The design is virtually identical to the earlier B18, thus most parts are functionally interchangeable, albeit with running changes to the manufacture and design of components. The B20 engine was used in the Volvo 120, 1800, 140, C202 and 240 series, and also in the Bofors Haubits FH77 howitzer. A modified version was used in the one-off 1969 Volvo GTZ concept car. The B20 was produced from 1969 to 1981.

There are five variations of this engine:
 B20A: Single carburettor version. First produced in 1969.
 B20B: Dual carburettor version with a higher compression ratio. First produced in 1969.
 B20D: Dual carburettor version with a lower compression ratio. First produced in 1971.
 B20E: Fuel injection version with a high compression ratio. First produced in 1970.
 B20F: Fuel injection version with low compression ratio. First produced in 1972 for lower emissions.

The B20E and B20F versions featured larger valves, and intake/exhaust ports and for 1974–1975 switched from electronic D-Jetronic to mechanical K-Jetronic injection.

In 1974 the number of bolts holding the flywheel increased from 6 to 8 and the size of the connecting rods was increased.

The B20A was revived for use in the C202 from 1977 to 1981.

B30 

From the 1969 model year Volvo produced a six-cylinder version of this engine called the B30 for the newly released Volvo 164. Adding two extra cylinders with the same dimensions to the B20 produced a  engine.

Engine chart

See also 
 List of Volvo engines
 Volvo B30 engine
 Volvo PV544
 Volvo P210 Duett
 Volvo 120 (Amazon)
 Volvo P1800
 Volvo 140
 Volvo 240
 Volvo C202

References

External links 

 

B18
Gasoline engines by model
Straight-four engines